Fernand Fédronic (born 21 December 1964) is a French former competitive figure skater. He is the 1982 Grand Prix International St. Gervais champion, 1984 Golden Spin of Zagreb bronze medalist, and 1985 1985 French national champion. He placed in the top ten at two European Championships and in the top fifteen at two World Championships. His elder brother, Dominique, also competed in figure skating. 

In 2014, Fédronic became the president of the World Inline Figure Skating Association.

Competitive highlights

References 

1964 births
French male single skaters
Living people
Figure skaters from Paris
20th-century French people